Charles William Peter Reynolds (September 14, 1885 – December 26, 1951) was an American football player and coach.  He served as the head football coach at Hobart College (1909–1913), Hamilton College (1914–1916), Bucknell University (1919–1923), Syracuse University (1925–1926), and Knox College in Galesburg, Illinois (1935–1937), compiling a career college football record of 77–58–14.  Reynolds died at the age of 66 on December 26, 1951, in Oneida, New York.

Head coaching record

References

External links
 

1885 births
1951 deaths
American football ends
Bucknell Bison football coaches
Hamilton Continentals football coaches
Hobart Statesmen football coaches
Knox Prairie Fire football coaches
Syracuse Orange football coaches
Syracuse Orange football players
People from Woodstock, New York
Players of American football from New York (state)